Milk paint is a nontoxic milk-based paint. It can be made from milk and lime, generally with pigments added for color. In other recipes, borax is mixed with milk's casein protein in order to activate the casein and as a preservative. 

Milk paint has been used for thousands of years. It is extremely durable, often lasting for hundreds of years if protected from the elements. It is made of all-natural ingredients, and is very safe and non-toxic once applied. Because oil based and acrylic based paints are made in vast quantities using natural linseed oil and sometimes petrochemicals, their price can be low relative to the price of milk paint, which is sold in small quantities. Another impediment to using milk paint for some is that it does not come pre-mixed. Milk paint is commonly sold in the powder form, which is a combination of casein and lime. Once water is added, the lime activates the casein and yields a durable but caustic paint that can be used only on porous surfaces. 

Before the invention of acrylics, most house paints were made from oil and less frequently casein. There is a vast number of historical production documents that outline the manufacture of milk paint on an industrial scale.  This type of manufacturing is being revived on a small scale, so that the advantages of an all natural paint can be combined with the convenience of a ready made paint that requires no mixing.

Milk paint made from the borax casein recipe keeps for six months or more, if sealed very tightly to retain the moisture. With time, however, the casein binder will break down. Once lime casein milk paint has been mixed, it must be used within a day, or a little longer if refrigerated.

Uses 
Milk paint can be used to create authentic reproductions and replicas of antique furniture, or modern pieces that do not rely on any connection with the past.

See also
Casein paint
Painting and the environment

References

Milk
Paints
Environmental impact of paint